Olearia chathamica is a species of flowering plant in the family Asteraceae. It is found only in New Zealand.

References

chathamica
Flora of the Chatham Islands
Near threatened plants
Taxonomy articles created by Polbot
Plants described in 1891